Rapmasters: From Tha Priority Vaults, Vol. 5 is the fifth volume of an eight volume budget compilation series released by Priority Records throughout 1996 and 1997. Unlike the previous two volumes, there is no fully uncut explicit version available and this and the remaining three volumes [as well as the first two volumes] are only available in mostly censored edited versions. The version of Brotha Lynch Hung's R.I.P. (Also known as Rest In Piss) that appears here is not the same version that is
found on Season of da Siccness but is rather the clean remixed and re-recorded version that would also appear on a couple of Brotha Lynch's best of collections and on The Best Of Black Market Records. Also, This volume is the only volume that doesn't feature Ice Cube (Whether as a solo artist or as an N.W.A member).

Track listing
 99 Ways To Die (Master P)
 You Gots To Chill (EPMD)
 Final Frontier (MC Ren)
 Marinatin' (Ras Kass)
 R.I.P. (Brotha Lynch Hung)
 Take a Hit (Mack 10)
 Whatcha See? (Paris)
 Had To Be a Hustler (Lil 1/2 Dead)
 Payback II (Mia X)

References

1997 compilation albums
Priority Records compilation albums
Gangsta rap compilation albums
Hip hop compilation albums
Record label compilation albums